Saint-Nicolas is a town and comune in the autonomous region of Aosta Valley, in northern Italy. Sitting like a balcony above the Dora Baltea Valley, Saint-Nicolas overlooks the four major lateral valleys of the mid-upper Aosta valley. These are (moving up the valley); Val de Cogne, Valsavarenche, Val de Rhêmes, and Valgrisenche.

Sites

Saint-Nicolas consists of a small city center and numerous hamlets or frazioni, locally officially called hameaux (in French). Among the most scenic is Persod, which is protected by the Italian "Belle Arti" laws. It consists of 35 stone houses with slate roofs connected by a thin road not large enough for a car to pass. Today, Persod has only six year-round residents, and about 8 regular weekenders from Milan and Saint-Pierre. The hamlet of Persod is recognizable even from the distance of a passing airplane as it the only village in the area surrounded by giant poplar trees.

A noted artisanal maker of Fontina cheese may be found just above the village of Chaillod.

Culture

Jean-Baptiste Cerlogne
Saint-Nicolas was the birthplace of Jean-Baptiste Cerlogne, a humble abbot who had pride in his region and its unique language, called Francoprovençal or Arpitan. He authored several noteworthy poems in his native patois and wrote the first grammar and dictionary devoted to the Valdôtain dialect.

Center for Francoprovençal Studies
The Center for Francoprovençal Studies (Le Centre d'études francoprovençales), or CEFP, located in the village of Fossaz-dessus, is one of the most important centers for Francoprovençal language research. It opened November 12, 1988 and was dedicated to the Aosta Valley writer and playwright René Willien. The CEFP occupies an 18th-century paysannes maison (farmhouse) native to the Aosta Valley, which was completely restored by architects Louis Bochet and Albert Breuvé. Typical of these multi-function structures, locally called a pailler, the animals, hay, and farm implements filled the barn (booué) on the ground floor, the family kitchen (meison) occupied first floor, and the sleeping room was located on the second floor. Among the center's holdings is the archive of the "Concours Cerlogne," a poetry, drama and music competition in the regional language reserved for elementary school students in the Aosta Valley that has been held annually since 1963.

The CEFP works in collaboration with the Regional Bureau of Ethnology and Linguistics  (Bureau régional pour l'ethnologie et la linguistique) (BREL) of Aosta, and other research centers in France and Swiss Romandy on its border.

Gerbore Museum
This museum, situated in the village of Lyverloulaz, demonstrates the impact of agricultural mechanization on the lives of Aosta Valley residents through the experiences of Joseph Gerbore. Funding by the municipality of Saint-Nicolas, the Aosta Valley Region, and the European Union, has enabled exhibitions, including Le temps des pionniers, at the Maison de la Tor, located in the center of the village of Lyveroulaz.

References